The State University of Tetova is a public university in North Macedonia. The university was established on 17 December 1994 as the first Albanian language higher education institution in Macedonia, though not recognized as a state university by the national government until January 2004. Courses and lectures are held in Albanian, Macedonian and English. As of 2018–19 school year, a total of 7,097 students are enrolled at the university.

History
The State University of Tetova was founded on 17 December 1994 upon the initiative of the Albanian Cultural Society of North Macedonia. The first lectures were held on February 16–17, 1995 in Poroj and Rečica.

Faculties and departments
The university consists of eleven faculties:
 Faculty of Economics
 Faculty of Law
 Faculty of Applied Sciences
 Faculty of Fine Arts
 Faculty of Philosophy
 Faculty of Philology
 Faculty of Medicine
 Faculty of Math-Natural Sciences
 Faculty of Food Technology
 Faculty of Physical Education
 Faculty of Business Administration
 Faculty of Agriculture and Biotechnology
 Faculty of Pedagogy

See also
 Balkan Universities Network

References

External links

 

Educational institutions established in 1994
State University of Tetova
Education in Tetovo
1994 establishments in the Republic of Macedonia